"Chrome" is a song written by Anthony Smith and Jeffrey Steele and recorded by American country music artist Trace Adkins. It was released in September 2002 as the third and final single and title track from his 2001 album of the same name. It peaked at number 10 on the United States Billboard Hot Country Singles & Tracks chart.

Before its release as a single, "Chrome" was the B-side to the album's first single, "I'm Tryin'."

Music video
The music video was directed by Michael Salomon.

Personnel
Compiled from liner notes.

 Trace Adkins — lead vocals
 Mike Brignardello — bass guitar
 Larry Franklin — fiddle
 Paul Franklin — steel guitar
 John Hobbs — piano
 Dann Huff — electric guitar
 Brent Mason — electric guitar
 Chris McHugh — drums
 Russell Terrell — background vocals
 Biff Watson — acoustic guitar

Chart positions
"Chrome" debuted at number 49 on the U.S. Billboard Hot Country Songs for the week of September 28, 2002.

Year-end charts

References

2002 singles
2001 songs
Trace Adkins songs
Songs written by Jeffrey Steele
Songs written by Anthony Smith (singer)
Song recordings produced by Dann Huff
Capitol Records Nashville singles
Music videos directed by Michael Salomon